Nomi Abadi is an American-Egyptian Jewish pianist, vocalist, actor and activist. In November 2019, she played piano on the Grammy Award nominated album Sekou Andrews & The String Theory nominated in 2020 in the category of Best Spoken Word Album.

Early life 
A piano prodigy born of four generations of piano teachers, Nomi's musical career began with a concert with the Orange County Chamber Orchestra as their youngest soloist ever at age 5, playing a Mozart concerto. Growing up in Orange County, California, Abadi was homeschooled by her mother and taught piano by her father, the late classical and ragtime pianist Marden Abadi. At age 8, she began professional training in classical piano at the Mannes School of Music after auditioning at Juilliard. She graduated early from the Orange County School of the Arts at age 16 and attended the American Academy of Dramatic Arts.

Music career 
Nomi has composed original music for over 15 film and video games, including the movie Gothic Springs (2019) starring Peyton List. 

Her video game composing includes original music, sound design and voicing three characters in The Clairvoyant AR, and music for Star Twin Locator both produced by Weird Sisters. After The Clairvoyant AR was featured at the San Diego Game Jam, it was invited via the Playcrafting organization to participate in the Bose Game Jam at the Bose AR Platform at PAX West in 2019

Abadi has composed and performed her own solo projects since 2012 and five solo EPs. Abadi received praise for her Omega release from buzzbands.la, who called the song "a lush, cascading pop track built around an acrobatic piano line".

Her vocals are featured in Satanic Planet's 2021 self-titled LP release on the track Devil In Me singing poetry by Satanic Temple founder Lucien Greaves. Following the success of Sekou Andrews and the String Theory,  Nomi joined String Theory on their album The Los Angeles Suite, featuring artists Jens Kuross, SORNE, Shana Halligan Vōx and Addie Hamilton.

NORY® double synth/keytar 
In 2017, Abadi invented the double keytar. The NORY® Double Synth was approved for a US Patent in 2019.

Discography and reception (2012-2020)
2012 - Chase/No Running (LP)
2015 - Nomi Abadi (EP)
2016 - Omega (EP)
2020 - Animals (Single)

Activism 
In 2020, Nomi founded the Female Composer Safety League, a public charity under IRC code 501(c)(3), which states that its mission is to provide networking, resources, community, support and allyship to up-and-coming women composers. According to a 2023 article in The Guardian, FCSL was launched after Nomi held two gender safety panels at GameSoundCon and has attracted hundreds of members. The Guardian cites that "Nomi vowed to expose the toxic, abusive work conditions that run rampant behind the closed doors of soundtrack composing studios" as "one of Hollywood’s last dirty secrets".  Ahead of the MusiCares gala preceding the 65th Annual Grammy Awards, Nomi spoke at a press conference in Downtown Los Angeles citing that the time for sexual predators in music is "over."  

In 2022, Nomi led a coalition to break the silence on sexual abuse at the Orange County School of the Arts, gaining the support of local residents, alumni and parents, and organizations including the Chairwoman and dozens of members of the Orange County Democratic Party. After three appearances by the coalition at the Orange County Board of Education public board meetings  the OCBE agreed to issue an investigation into OCSA. The Orange County Register has reported on four separate OCSA faculty lawsuits.

References

Year of birth missing (living people)
Living people
Musicians from Los Angeles
Orange County School of the Arts alumni
American women pianists
American people of Egyptian descent
People from Orange County, California
Jewish American musicians